Girlguiding is the operating name of The Guide Association, previously named The Girl Guides Association and is the national guiding organisation of the United Kingdom. It is the UK's largest girl-only youth organisation. Girlguiding is a charitable organisation.

Within Girlguiding, participants take on adventurous activities, such as climbing, canoeing, sailing and orienteering and have the opportunity to get involved in camps and international events, including girl-only festivals and overseas development projects. In local groups – called 'units' – girls complete badges and challenges that cover topics from circus skills, stargazing and scientific investigation, to first aid, camping and community action.

Each year, the organisation publishes the Girls' Attitudes Survey, which surveys the views of girls and young women on topics such as body image, career aspirations and mental health. Girlguiding is also a campaigning organisation, having supported the No More Page 3 campaign and lobbied the government on sexual harassment in schools, women's political representation and media sexism.

Guiding began in the UK in 1910, when Robert Baden-Powell, founder of The Scout Association, established a separate organisation for girls. The Guide Association was a founding member of the World Association of Girl Guides and Girl Scouts (WAGGGS) in 1928.

Girlguiding is supported by around 100,000 volunteers.

History

Following the origin of the Boy Scouts in 1907 many girls took up Scouting. In 1909, a number of Girl Scouts attended the Boy Scout Rally in Crystal Palace Park  The girls told Robert Baden Powell that they wanted 'to do the same thing as the boys'. Guiding was introduced to respond to the demand.

In 1910 Robert Baden-Powell formed the Girl Guides and asked his sister Agnes to look after the Girl Guides organisation. A few years later Baden-Powell's new wife Olave became involved and, in 1918, was appointed Chief Guide.

The name Guides was chosen from Baden-Powell's military background, "Guides" had operated in the north-west frontier in India, their main task was to go on hazardous expeditions. These men had particularly influenced Baden-Powell as they continued training minds and body even when off duty. As a result, Baden Powell decided Girl Guides would be a suitable name for the pioneering young women's movement he wished to establish.

In 1914 Rosebuds were established for girls aged 8–10, this name was later changed to Brownies. Two years later in 1916 the first Senior Guide groups were formed, in 1920 these groups became Rangers. 1943 saw the establishment of the Trefoil Guild for members over 21 (now 18) who wished to remain a part of the movement but couldn't remain active with a unit. The section for the youngest members of the association, Rainbows, was introduced in 1987 for girls aged 5–7 (4–7 in Ulster).

In 1936 the then Girl Guides Association was one of the founding members of The National Council for Voluntary Youth Services (NCVYS), which was created with the aim of promoting and supporting youth development work across England. Girlguiding has remained a member of NCVYS ever since.

In 1964, a "Working Party" was established to review and update the whole programme of the association; their 195-page report was published in 1966 under the title Tomorrow's Guide. These recommendations were implemented in 1968 and included new uniforms, badges and awards across all the sections of the association. Land, Sea and Air Rangers were merged into a single Ranger Guide Service Section.

Programme
Girls are organised into sections by age. These are Rainbows, Brownies, Guides and Rangers.

Rainbow Guides
Rainbow Guides or Rainbows are aged from 4 to 7 years old (5 in some areas). Activities are organised around six core areas: Know Myself, Be Well, Express Myself, Take Action, Have Adventures, Skills For My Future. In the 1980s and 1990s, Rainbows wore a tabard in one of the colours of the Rainbow. Nowadays, the red uniform is worn, with Rainbows often referred to as “Little Reds.” There is a baseball cap, cycling shorts, hoodie, joggers, and polo shirt to choose from.

Each girl makes a promise on their enrolment in a Rainbow unit and must be able to understand and carry out the promise. This Promise is a simplified version of the promise that older members make.

Rainbows can also receive other badges for activities that they attend (possibly with other units), and other activities they complete within their unit, maybe after a themed half term. During 2008, a special challenge book Olivia's Favourites was produced to commemorate the 21st Birthday of the section and a badge was produced.

At the end of the Rainbow programme, as the girls get ready to move on to Brownies, girls undertake the personal Pot of Gold Challenge.

Brownie Guides
Brownie Guides or Brownies are aged seven to ten years old. They go along to camps, holidays, day trips and sleepovers. They get together with their friends at regular meetings where they learn new hobbies, get creative, develop skills and have outdoor adventures.

Brownies work within six themes: Know Myself, Be Well, Express Myself, Take Action, Have Adventures, Skills For My Future. Brownies can choose to work on unit meeting activities, skills builders and interest badges.

Brownies units are divided into Sixes, small groups of girls who work together. Sixes are traditionally named after fairies e.g., Gnomes, Elves, Leprechauns; however, many Units have adopted the newer six naming style of woodland animals. Each six has a leader named a 'Sixer' and a deputy leader, a 'Second'. The adult leader in charge was traditionally called Brown Owl with other leaders being named after other owls, such as Snowy, Tawny, and Barn. However, these days, only some units still use owl naming – although the variety of owls has increased much, e.g., Wise, Little, Rainbow. But most units have a variety of themes including flowers, Winnie the Pooh characters, gems or even stars. 

Brownies have mix and match clothing based around the colours of yellow, brown and blue. Items include baseball caps, gilets, cycle shorts, hoodies, leggings, long-sleeved tops, short sleeved tops, skorts, trousers and a sash. Brownie units may also wear neckers.

Guides
Guides are aged 10 to 14 years old. Guides work within six core themes: Know Myself, Be Well, Express Myself, Take Action, Have Adventures, Skills For My Future. 
Guides can choose to work on unit meeting activities, skills builders and interest badges. They take part in indoor and outdoor activities that challenge them to do their best. Guides choose and plan most of their own activities, which can include themed evenings and trips.

Guide units meet regularly, usually once a week during school terms. There are often other opportunities for Guides to take part in special activities and events throughout the year. Many Guide units go away on holiday, to camp or on overnight sleepovers.

Guides work in small groups between 4 and 8 called a patrol. Patrol names vary between different units but include flowers, like rose and poppy, animals, like panda and parrot and famous landmarks, like pyramids. Each patrol is run by a patrol leader who is assisted by her patrol seconder. The Patrol Leader can be elected by her patrol, elected by the whole unit or chosen by the leadership team. The Patrol Leader is given extra assistance from the leader team to develop her Leadership skills.

Rangers and Young Leaders (previously known as Senior Section)
For girls between 14 and 18 years old, there are a variety of schemes and groups to choose from.
 Young Leaders work with Rainbows, Brownies or Guides. They can work towards the Young Leadership Qualification as well as other Rangers opportunities.
 Rangers meet together to plan and carry out activities, they may work towards any opportunities available to Rangers members.
 Duke of Edinburgh's Award Participant: a Rangers member who has chosen to focus on the Duke of Edinburgh's Award.
 Lone Ranger: a Rangers member who is working on part of The Rangers programme, but is not part of a standard unit. She may belong to a Lone Unit with other Lone members with support from Leaders who deliver the programme remotely.
 Peer Educator: (Previously known as In4mer) anyone who has undergone the Girl Guiding peer education training and continues to run Peer Education sessions
 Student Scout and Guide Organisation (SSAGO) Member: For members who are studying at higher education (such as a university or college).
 Appointment Holder
 Innovate – an annual residential event of varying location across the UK which offers Rangers members an opportunity to voice their concerns and brainstorm new ideas for the future of Girlguiding.
With the new program Rangers have new badges in the same vein as the younger sections.
This group choose to wear a hoodie, jacket, polo shirt, or smart shirt.

Rangers Awards and Qualifications
 Young Leader Qualification
 Chief Guide's Challenge
 Commonwealth Award
 Queen's Guide Award
 Residential permits
 Adult Leadership Qualification
 The Duke of Edinburgh's Award

Uniform
The Girlguiding uniform has evolved over the years, from its first design by Baden-Powell and his sister: long dresses, neckerchiefs (like the Scouts) and wide hats.  The previous uniform was designed by Ally Capellino in 2000. There are no compulsory trousers, for guides and rangers but girls in guiding wear what is appropriate for the activities. Rainbows and Brownies can chose from skorts, cycling shorts, leggings, joggers or trousers.

Promise
All adult members of Girlguiding  make a promise upon joining but young members only have to do so before achieving section awards. The current promises for each section are:

Rainbows:
I promise that I will do my best,
to think about my beliefs,
and to be kind and helpful.

Brownies, Guides, members of The Senior Section and Leaders:
I promise that I will do my best;
To be true to myself and develop my beliefs,
To serve the King and my community,
To help other people and
To keep the (Brownie) Guide Law.

History of the Promise
The guide's promise was changed several times due to religious beliefs being offended. In 1994, the promise was altered from 'To do my duty to God' to 'To love my God', in order to accommodate different faiths and the word 'God' was allowed to be replaced with a faith's own word for their god (e.g. Allah). Some do not feel they are able to make a promise that mentions god, particularly atheists and this has attracted criticism from the National Secular Society.

In 2013 a nationwide consultation of the promise was carried out by Girlguiding. This took the form of a questionnaire with 44,000 respondents being asked for opinions on each line of the promise (not just 'Love my God') and gave a number of options of different wordings. Effective from 1 September 2013, the words 'to be true to me and develop my beliefs' replaced 'to love my God', and the words 'to serve the Queen and my community' replaced 'to serve the Queen and my country'. The rewording has been criticised by some Christian organisations.

Brownie Guide Law
A Brownie Guide thinks of others before herself, and does a good turn every day.

Guide Law for Guides, The Rangers and Leaders
 A Guide is honest, reliable and can be trusted.
 A Guide is helpful and uses her time and abilities wisely.
 A Guide faces challenges and learns from her experiences.
 A Guide is a good friend and a sister to all Guides.
 A Guide is polite and considerate.
 A Guide respects all living things and takes care of the world around her.

Administrative structure in the UK
For effective administration of Girlguiding, the UK is split into smaller areas. At the top level there are ten Countries and Regions.

The Countries are:
 Girlguiding Scotland
 Girlguiding Ulster
 Girlguiding Cymru
 Girlguiding BGIFC = British Guides in Foreign Countries

The Regions are:
 Girlguiding Anglia
 Girlguiding London and South East England (known as LaSER)
 Girlguiding Midlands
 Girlguiding North East England
 Girlguiding North West England
 Girlguiding South West England (includes the Channel Islands, etc.)

Countries and Regions are split into Counties. These in turn are split into Divisions. Divisions are split into Districts. In some areas with few members, County, Division or District level may be omitted because effective communication occurs without it. Each area is led by a Commissioner.

Girlguiding outside the United Kingdom
Girlguiding is also active outside the United Kingdom. In nine British overseas territories, there are branch associations with slightly different Guiding programmes adapted to the local conditions. Most of the branch associations use different uniforms or lighter textiles.

Branch Associations are active in
 Anguilla
 Bermuda
 The British Virgin Islands
 The Cayman Islands
 The Falkland Islands
 Gibraltar
 Montserrat
 St Helena, Ascension and Tristan da Cunha
 The Turks and Caicos Islands 

More details can be found in The Branch Association Members website.

British Royal Family in Guiding
Guiding in the UK has had a long association with the British Royal Family, in 1920 Princess Mary, daughter of George V became President of the Association, 1937 saw Princess Elizabeth, who would go on to be Queen Elizabeth II become a Guide, and Princess Margaret become a Brownie. Princess Elizabeth joined the 1st Buckingham Palace Unit, whose first meeting was held on 9 June. She became the Second of Kingfisher Patrol, and was enrolled by her Aunt Princess Mary, Association President, on 13 December. At the start of World War II the company was closed, and the Queen and Princess Margaret were attached to a Balmoral Company. In 1942 the Buckingham Palace company reopened at Windsor, the Queen became Patrol Leader of Swallow Patrol. In 1943 the Queen became a Sea Ranger undertaking usual activities including gaining her boating permit and taking out the Queen Mother in a dinghy. She became Chief Ranger of the British Empire in 1946. When she married Lieutenant Mountbatten two of her bridesmaids were former members of the Buckingham Palace company. In 1952 when she ascended the throne she became the association patron.

When Princess Mary died Princess Margaret became the new President in 1965. In turn on the death of Princess Margaret, the Duchess of Edinburgh (then the Countess of Wessex), wife to Prince Edward became President in 2003. The highest award in Guiding, the Queen's Guide award was created in 1946, this is now presented by the Association President.

Centenary celebrations
Girlguiding celebrated its centenary in 2010. The historic maze at Crystal Palace was re-opened on 5 September, remembering the 1909 Crystal Palace Scout Rally.

The Centenary Camp was held from 31 July–7 August 2010 at Harewood House.

The tall ship Lord Nelson made a 100-day voyage around the coast of the UK to celebrate the centenary. The Lord Nelson set sail from Glasgow on 7 June 2010. She has called at Oban, Aberdeen, Newcastle, Boston, London, Chatham, Portsmouth, Falmouth, Milford Haven and Whitehaven. At each port she took on new crew, many of whom had never sailed before.

See also
 The Scout Association
 National Scout and Guide Symphony Orchestra
 The National Council for Voluntary Youth Services (NCVYS)
 Verily Anderson
 Girl Guides
 Foxlease
 Anstice Gibbs
 Silver Fish Award

References

External links

 Girlguiding
 British Guides in Foreign Countries
 Branch Association Members

Organisations based in the City of Westminster
Youth organizations established in 1910
World Association of Girl Guides and Girl Scouts member organizations
Youth organisations based in the United Kingdom
 
1910 establishments in the United Kingdom